The 41st World Artistic Gymnastics Championships was held at The O2 Arena in London from 12 to 18 October 2009. Similar to the 2005 World Championships, there were no team competitions. Individual all-around and event finals were contested.

Competition schedule 
(Local time, UTC+1)

13 October 2009   Men's Qualification
09:50 Subdivision 1
14:30 Subdivision 2
19:00 Subdivision 3
14 October 2009  Women's Qualification
09:50 Subdivision 1
12:30 Subdivision 2
15:40 Subdivision 3
18:20 Subdivision 4
20:50 Subdivision 5

15 October 2009 18:30 Men's All-around Final
16 October 2009 18:30  Women's All-around Final
17 October 2009   Apparatus Final Day 1
13:00 Men's Floor Exercise
13:40 Women's Vault
14:45 Men's Pommel Horse
15:25 Women's Uneven Bars
16:05 Men's Rings

18 October 2009  Apparatus Final Day 2
13:00 Men's Vault
13:35 Women's Balance Beam
14:35 Men's Parallel Bars
15:15 Women's Floor Exercise
15:50 Men's Horizontal Bar

Medal winners

Women's 
 2009 World Artistic Gymnastics Championships – Women's qualification

Men's Events

Qualification

Individual all-around

Oldest and youngest competitors

Floor 

Oldest and youngest competitors

Pommel horse 

Oldest and youngest competitors

Rings 

Oldest and youngest competitors

Vault 

Oldest and youngest competitors

Parallel bars 

Oldest and youngest competitors

Horizontal bar 

Oldest and youngest competitors

Women's

Qualification

Individual all-around 

Oldest and youngest competitors

Vault 

Oldest and youngest competitors

Uneven bars 

Oldest and youngest competitors

Balance beam 

Oldest and youngest competitors

Floor 

Oldest and youngest competitors

‡ = Jessica Gil Ortiz was unable to complete her floor exercise routine due to injury.

Medal table

Overall

Men

Women

References

External links

 London 2009 World Artistic Gymnastics Championships Official Website
 Official results

 
World Artistic Gymnastics Championships
World Artistic Gymnastics Championships
Artistic World 2009
World Artistic Gymnastics Championships
International sports competitions in London
Sport in the Royal Borough of Greenwich
2009 in British sport
October 2009 sports events in the United Kingdom